is a private university in Urayasu, Chiba, Japan.

History
The university was founded in 1970, and obtained its present name in 1988.

Programs
The university's School of Dentistry is located in Sakado, Saitama.

References

External links
 
 Sakado Campus website 

Educational institutions established in 1988
Private universities and colleges in Japan
Universities and colleges in Chiba Prefecture
Universities and colleges in Saitama Prefecture
Urayasu, Chiba
1988 establishments in Japan